Cosa resta... Un fiore is the second studio album by Italian singer-songwriter Alice, released under the stage name 'Alice Visconti' in 1978 on CBS Records.

The track "Io voglio vivere", which had been a minor hit in 1975, was again included on this album, and a Spanish-language version entitled "Dices que he sido infiel" was also released in Spain. Both were again moderately successful and "Dices que he sido infiel" remains the one and only Castilian recording in Alice's career to date.

The Cosa resta... Un fiore album was re-released on CD in Japan in 2006 in Warner Music's European Rock Collection series.

Track listing
Side A
"Un fiore" (Luigi Lopez, Carla Vistarini) – 4:29
"Un'isola" (Luigi Lopez, Carla Vistarini) – 4:41
"Una mia semplice storia" (Stefano D'Orazio, Renato Brioschi) – 3:37 
"Chi mi apprezza e chi disprezza" (Stefano D'Orazio, Marcello Aitiani, Mercurio) – 2:57
"Io voglio vivere" (Stefano D'Orazio, Renato Brioschi, Cristiano Minellono) – 5:22

Side B
"Senza l'amore" (Luigi Lopez, Carla Vistarini) – 4:26 
"Alberi" (Luigi Lopez) – 4:01
"Cose" (Luigi Lopez, Carla Vistarini) – 3:42 
"...E respiro" (Riccardo Fogli, Danilo Vaona) – 4:21 
"Mondo a matita" (Luigi Lopez, Carla Vistarini) – 5:45

Personnel
 Alice Visconti – lead vocals, piano
 Danilo Vaona –  piano, Polymoog, Minimoog, Hammond organ, Eminent, mellotron, harpsichord, bells, Hohner, Celeste, Sistro, Fender piano
 Mino Fabiano – bass guitar
 Gianni D'Aquila – drums, timpani, percussion instruments
 Massimo Luca – electric and acoustic guitars
 Enzo Giuffrè – electric and acoustic guitars
 Luigi Lopez – electric and acoustic guitars
 F. Mancini – harmonica
 Marlaena Kessick – flute, Ottavino

Production
 Giancarlo Lucariello – record producer
 Danilo Vaona – musical arranger, orchestral conductor 
 Enzo Maffione – sound engineer
 Recorded at Double Recording Studios, Milan
 Luciano Tallarini – graphic design
 Mauro Balletti – photography

Sources and external links
[ Allmusic entry]

1978 albums
Alice (singer) albums
Columbia Records albums
Italian-language albums